Rotala malampuzhensis is a terrestrial annual gregarious herb. It is endemic to the Western Ghats.

Description
The stems are many branched, creeping and rooting below. Leaves are narrow, sessile, oppositely arranged alternately at right angles, microscopically truncate at apex. The flowers and fruits are solitary, sessile and crimson color.

Distribution and habitat
In Kerala this plant is common in Alappuzha, Kozhikkode, Malappuram, Palakkad, Kottayam, and Kannur districts in moist areas.

References

malampuzhensis